Almetovo (Älmät) is a rural locality (a village) in Bik-Karmalinsky Selsoviet, Davlekanovsky District, Bashkortostan, Russia. The population was 24 as of 2010.  There is 1 street.

Geography 
Almetovo is located 19 km southeast of Davlekanovo (the district's administrative centre) by road. Rublevka is the nearest rural locality.

References 

Rural localities in Davlekanovsky District